Island Lake is a lake in Alberta.

Athabasca County
Island Lake